Top Chef: Miami is the third season of the American reality television series Top Chef. It was first filmed in Miami, Florida, before concluding in Aspen, Colorado. The season was Emmy nominated for Outstanding Reality Competition Series, and garnered the Emmy Award for Best Editing in the category.   Season 3 premiered on June 13, 2007 and ended on October 10, 2007. Padma Lakshmi returned with Tom Colicchio, Gail Simmons, and new judge Ted Allen, who switched off with Simmons throughout the season. Top Chef: San Francisco contestant Lee Anne Wong was brought in as a food consultant and assisted in planning the challenges. Production took place in April and May 2007 in Miami Beach, Florida, with production activity centered at the Fontainebleau Hotel. The winning recipe from each week's episode of Season 3 was featured on Bravo's Top Chef website and prepared by Lee Anne Wong in a web series called The Wong Way to Cook. In the season finale, Hung Huynh was declared the winner over runners-up Dale Levitski and Casey Thompson. Thompson was voted Fan Favorite.

Contestants
Fifteen chefs were selected to compete in Top Chef: Miami.

Dale Levitski, Casey Thompson, and Tre Wilcox returned to compete in Top Chef: All-Stars. Chris "CJ" Jacobson returned for Top Chef: Seattle, and  later competed in Top Chef Duels. Thompson returned again for Top Chef: Charleston. Brian Malarkey returned for Top Chef: All-Stars L.A. Sandee Birdsong became the supervisor for Top Chef culinary production team from the seventh season onwards.

Contestant progress

: The chef(s) did not receive immunity for winning the Quickfire Challenge.
: As a reward for winning the Quickfire Challenge, Dale was allowed to sit out the Elimination Challenge.
: There were no eliminations in Episode 10.
 (WINNER) The chef won the season and was crowned "Top Chef".
 (RUNNER-UP) The chef was a runner-up for the season.
 (WIN) The chef won the Elimination Challenge.
 (HIGH) The chef was selected as one of the top entries in the Elimination Challenge, but did not win.
 (IN) The chef was not selected as one of the top or bottom entries in the Elimination Challenge and was safe.
 (LOW) The chef was selected as one of the bottom entries in the Elimination Challenge, but was not eliminated.
 (OUT) The chef lost the Elimination Challenge.

Episodes

References
Notes

Footnotes

External links
 Official website

Top Chef
2007 American television seasons
Television shows set in Miami
Television shows filmed in Florida
Television shows filmed in New Jersey
Television shows filmed in New York (state)
Television shows filmed in Colorado